Sputnik Weazel (born in Manchester in the 1960s) is a British singer-songwriter, composer, artist and session musician. In a career that was inspired by the beat poets and politicised by punk, Sputnik has busked with Eddie Izzard, jammed with Jools Holland, and performed at numerous venues and festivals throughout Europe.  Sputnik has written and released over 200 original songs to date, and has released 20 independent studio albums. From 2011 to 2016, Sputnik occupied the drum stool for the folk/punk band The Men They Couldn't Hang, playing drums and piano on their crowd-funded album, The Defiant (2014). Sputnik's latest studio recording Eulogy is a thought provoking collection of eclectic tracks, covering a wide range of subject matters.

Bands
The Weazels
Surfin' Lungs
Stefan Cush and the Feral Family
The Men They Couldn't Hang

Musical career
Sputnik was one of the founder members of The Weazels (or Jimmy The Weazel as they were also known) in the 1980s. The Weazels toured extensively and in one year, the original band members (Polly, Al, & Sputnik) did over 250 gigs, once doing five gigs in three countries in two days, plus busking in every town they visited. The Weazels played to any audience willing to have them, and at every kind of venue you could imagine; from arts centres to bikers bars, and front rooms to stadiums.

Personal life
In 2007, Sputnik moved to West Wales where he lives with his partner.

References

Living people
Year of birth missing (living people)
Musicians from Manchester
English male singer-songwriters